Network SouthEast (NSE) was one of the three passenger sectors of British Rail created in 1982. NSE mainly operated commuter rail trains within Greater London and inter-urban services in densely populated South East England, although the network went as far west as Exeter. Before 1986, the sector was originally known as London & South Eastern.

During the privatisation of British Rail, it was gradually divided into a number of franchises.

History

Before the sectorisation of British Rail (BR) in 1982 the system was split into largely autonomous regional operations: those operating around London were the London Midland Region, Southern Region, Western Region, and Eastern Region. Sectorisation of BR changed this setup by organising by the traffic type: commuter services in the south-east of England, long-distance intercity services, local services in the UK regions, parcels and freight. The aim was to introduce greater budgetary efficiency and managerial accountability by building a more market-focused and responsive business, rather than privatising BR completely. It was expected that the London and South East sector would cover most of its operating costs from revenues, in contrast to heavily subsidised rural services.

Upon sectorisation, the London & South Eastern sector took over responsibility for passenger services in the south-east of England, working with the existing BR business units of Regions and Functions to deliver the overall service. Day-to-day operation, staffing and timetabling continued to be delivered by the Regions – and the sector came into existence with barely thirty staff based at Waterloo.

On 10 June 1986, L&SE was relaunched as Network SouthEast, along with a new red, white and blue livery. The relaunch was intended to be more than a superficial rebranding and was underpinned by considerable investment in the presentation of stations and trains, as well as efforts to improve service standards. This approach was largely brought about by a new director, Chris Green, who had presided over similar transformation and rebranding of ScotRail.

Although NSE did not originally own or maintain infrastructure, it exercised control over almost all carrier core functions. NSE set its own goals and service standards in consultation with BR, and created its own management structure and oversight. BR allowed NSE to decide about scheduling, marketing, infrastructure enhancements, and rolling stock specifications on NSE-assigned lines and services.

In April 1990, British Rail Chairman Bob Reid announced that sectorisation would be made complete, with regions disbanded by 199192 and the individual sectors becoming directly responsible for all operations other than a few core long-term planning and standards functions. Network SouthEast thus went from a business unit of around 300staff to a major business operation with 38,000staff and a £4.7billion asset value – large enough to be ranked as the 15th-biggest business in the UK.

Network SouthEast, like each other sector, was given primary responsibility for various assets (rolling stock, tracks, stations), and control resided with the primary user. Other sectors could negotiate access rights and rent facilities, using their own resources.  NSE was able to exert much greater control and accountability over both its operating budget and service quality than BR could under its Regions. Relations were generally good between NSE and other sectors, although operating pressures sometimes forced staff to use equipment and assets belonging to other sectors to meet immediate needs.

On 1 April 1994, Network SouthEast was disbanded with its operations transferred to train operating units ready for privatisation.

Network Railcard

Although NSE ceased to exist in 1994, the grouping of services that it defined before privatisation remain grouped by the Network Railcard, which can be bought for £30 and which offers a 34% discount for adults and 60% discount for accompanying children after 10:00 on weekdays and all day at weekends (subject to a minimum weekday fare of £13). Holders of annual season tickets for journeys within the Network area, including on London Underground, are issued with a "Gold Card" which gives them similar privileges to the Network Railcard.

Rolling stock

Subdivisions
NSE was broken down into various sub-divisions.

Modernisation

Soon after conception, Network SouthEast started to modernise parts of the network, which had become run down after years of under-investment. The most extreme example was the Chiltern Lines.

Chiltern Lines
The Chiltern Line ran on two railway lines (Chiltern Main Line and London to Aylesbury Line) from London Marylebone to Aylesbury and Banbury. These lines were former GWR and GCR intercity lines to Wolverhampton and Nottingham respectively. After the Beeching Axe in the 1960s, these lines became seriously run down with a lack of investment and a reduction of services.

By the late 1980s, the 25-year-old Class 115s needed replacement; the lines had low speed limits and were still controlled by semaphore signalling from the early 1900s; and Marylebone was served only by infrequent local trains to and from High Wycombe and Aylesbury.

Numerous plans for the lines were proposed. One serious plan was to close the line between Marylebone and South Ruislip/Harrow-on-the-Hill, and convert Marylebone into a coach station. Metropolitan line trains would be extended to Aylesbury and BR services from Aylesbury would be routed to London Paddington via High Wycombe. Also the line north of Princes Risborough would close. However, this did not happen as Baker Street and London Paddington would not have been able to cope with the extra trains and passengers.

What did happen was total route modernisation. This was an ambitious plan to bring the lines into the modern era of rail travel. Class 115s were replaced by new Class 165s. Semaphore signals were replaced by standard colour light signals and ATP was fitted on the line and trains. Stations were refurbished and even reconstructed (£10 million spent on stations alone), and signal boxes and the freight depots/sidings were demolished. Regular services to Banbury, and a few specials to Birmingham were introduced and a new maintenance depot was built at Aylesbury. This was a massive undertaking and work began in 1988 and by 1992, the route had been completely modernised, demand for the service had grown considerably and the route had become profitable.

Since modernisation the route has seen further improvements (see Chiltern Main Line).

Electrification was considered but was deemed to be too expensive as the Thames Line sector would then have to be electrified as well. Another reason electrification did not take place was that some part of the line ran on underground lines, which were electrified as 4-rail 660 V DC, while British Rail preferred 25 kV AC overhead traction for lines north of London.

Success of the modernisation implemented by NSE has made it possible for the Chiltern Main Line to compete with the West Coast Main Line between London and Birmingham, and there are now plans to increase speeds and quadruple sections of the line, returning the line to the state it was before the Beeching Axe.

New trains

Network SouthEast started a programme of replacing old rolling stock up to privatisation.

 Chiltern  165
 Great Eastern  321
 Great Northern  365
 Island Line  483 (ex London Underground 1938 Stock)
 Kent Link  465, 466
 North Downs  165, 166
 Northampton Line  321
 Solent and Wessex  442
 South London Lines  456
 Thames  165, 166
 Thameslink  319
 Waterloo & City  482 (now London Underground 1992 Stock)
 West Anglia  315, 317, 322
 West of England  159

Privatisation
On 1 April 1994, as part of the privatisation of British Rail, Network SouthEast was divided up into train operating units which would later become passenger franchises:

One element of NSE that remained in public ownership was the Waterloo & City Line; too small to be operated as a self-contained franchise, it was not incorporated with the rest of NSE services from Waterloo into the South West Trains operation, and was instead transferred to London Underground.

Legacy

Although NSE ceased to exist in 1994, its logos, livery and signage would linger well into the following decades. Southeastern, Southern and First Capital Connect trains continued to run in NSE livery until as late as 2007.

Underground stations on the Moorgate branch of the Great Northern route (Highbury & Islington, Essex Road, Old Street and Moorgate) used to have the NSE era colour schemes after going through 3 privatised operators (WAGN, First Capital Connect and Great Northern) until late-2018.

NSE signage and logos can be found across the Island Line, Isle of Wight, with particularly well-maintained examples existing at the Ryde Pier Head and Shanklin ticket offices. Kew Gardens station in London still has the NSE logo on a plaque in the booking hall marking the station's reopening by Michael Portillo in 1989.

The last train still in NSE livery was withdrawn on 15 September 2007 when 465193, was sent for revinyling.

In 2002, the Network SouthEast Railway Society was formed to keep the memories of NSE alive by re-promoting through merchandise that they make to raise money for their 4-CIG EMU No.1753 which was named 'Chris Green' at the NSE 30 event at Finmere, Oxfordshire by the ex-NSE boss himself. On 28 August 2015, the Network SouthEast Railway Society obtained the trademark of Network SouthEast's brandname, logo and typeface. The group wanted to obtain the trademark to help Network SouthEast's name and legacy live on following its demise and educate about NSE.

In 2017, the Railway Heritage Trust collaborated with train operator Govia Thameslink Railway to recreate the Network SouthEast image at Downham Market station as a commemorative measure. The station has been equipped with paintwork and signage that mimic the Network SouthEast branding of the late 1980s.

References

Further reading

British Railways Board: London and South East Commuter Services, 1980 Competition Commission report
British Railways Board: Network South East, 1987 Competition Commission report

External links

Thameslink
British Rail brands
History of rail transport in London
British Rail passenger services
1986 establishments in England
1994 disestablishments in England